Holland Summit is a former settlement in Los Angeles County, California. It lay at an elevation of 4147 feet (1264 m). Holland Summit still appeared on USGS maps as of 1947.

References

Former settlements in Los Angeles County, California
Former populated places in California